List of Japanese armored divisions of the Imperial Japanese Army. During World War II, the IJA only organized four divisions, these were:

IJA First Tank Division
IJA Second Tank Division
IJA Third Tank Division
IJA Fourth Tank Division

Notes

References 

Japanese World War II divisions
Japanese military-related lists

ja:大日本帝国陸軍師団一覧